Bob Cooper (born November 13, 1935) is a retired driver who raced in the Grand National Series from 1962 to 1969.

Career
Cooper has raced 64 races over the course of eight years resulting in nine finishes in the top ten. He has also done 8,982 laps earning $17,495 in the process ($ when considering inflation). Average finishes for this driver's career is 21st while his average career start is in 23rd place.

Dirt track racing was Bob Cooper's greatest strength, with his average finishes on tracks of that kind being 14th place. However, Cooper would find his weakness on tri-oval intermediate tracks with a finish of 34th place being typical.

References

1935 births
Living people
NASCAR drivers
People from Gastonia, North Carolina
Racing drivers from North Carolina